In the AFL Women's (AFLW), the St Kilda best and fairest award is awarded to the best and fairest player at the St Kilda Football Club during the home-and-away season, equivalent to the Trevor Barker Award for the men's team. The award has been awarded annually since the club's inaugural season in the competition in 2020.

The inaugural count, held remotely due to the COVID-19 pandemic, resulted in a four-way tie.

Recipients

See also

 Trevor Barker Award (list of St Kilda Football Club best and fairest winners in the Australian Football League)

References

AFL Women's awards
Lists of AFL Women's players
St Kilda Football Club (AFLW) players
Awards established in 2020